Los Esteros is a village located in the commune of La Unión in Los Ríos Region, in Southern Chile.

References

Geography of Los Ríos Region
Populated places in Ranco Province